Poeciloneta is a genus of sheet weavers that was first described by C. Chyzer & Władysław Kulczyński in 1894.

Species
 it contains fourteen species, found in Europe:
Poeciloneta ancora Zhai & Zhu, 2008 – China
Poeciloneta bellona Chamberlin & Ivie, 1943 – USA
Poeciloneta bihamata (Emerton, 1882) – USA
Poeciloneta calcaratus (Emerton, 1909) – Canada, USA
Poeciloneta canionis Chamberlin & Ivie, 1943 – USA
Poeciloneta fructuosa (Keyserling, 1886) – USA
Poeciloneta lyrica (Zorsch, 1937) – North America
Poeciloneta pallida Kulczyński, 1908 – Russia
Poeciloneta petrophila Tanasevitch, 1989 – Russia, Canada
Poeciloneta tanasevitchi Marusik, 1991 – Russia
Poeciloneta theridiformis (Emerton, 1911) – Russia, North America
Poeciloneta vakkhanka Tanasevitch, 1989 – Russia, USA (Alaska), Canada
Poeciloneta variegata (Blackwall, 1841) (type) – North America, Europe, Russia (European to Far East), China
Poeciloneta xizangensis Zhai & Zhu, 2008 – China

See also
 List of Linyphiidae species (I–P)

References

Araneomorphae genera
Linyphiidae
Spiders of China
Spiders of North America
Spiders of Russia